Alain Duschène (born 19 March 1960) is a former Luxembourg Army general. On the 30 September 2017, he became Luxembourg's Chief of Defence, the professional head of the country's military, replacing former defence chief General Romain Mancinelli. He was succeeded by Steve Thull in 2020.

He graduated in 1984 from the École Royale Militaire (ERM) in Brussels.

Decorations and awards 
Officier avec Couronne, Order of Adolphe of Nassau
Commander, Order of the Oak Crown
Commander, Order of Merit of the Grand Duchy of Luxembourg
Croix d’Honneur et de Mérite militaire en Bronze
25 Years Service Cross
Prince Jean de Luxembourg Commemorative Medal
Medal for Sports Merit en vermeil

References

External links

 Biography of Alain Duschène at NATO site.
 Biography of Alain Duschène on Luxembourg Army site. 

 
Luxembourgian soldiers
1960 births
Living people